Tyhjyys (Finnish for "emptiness") is the third studio album by the Finnish dark metal band Ajattara. It was released in 2004 on Spikefarm Records.

Track listing

Personnel
 Ruoja - vocals, guitars, keyboards
 Atoni - bass
 Malakias III - drums

Additional personnel and staff
 Niklas Sundin - cover art
 Mika Jussila - mastering
 Tuomo Valtonen - producer

External links
 Tyhjyys at Allmusic

2004 albums
Ajattara albums